The North Fork Arikaree River is a  tributary of the Arikaree River in eastern Colorado.  It flows from a source in western Lincoln County to a confluence with the Arikaree River in Washington County.

See also
List of Colorado rivers

References

Rivers of Colorado
Rivers of Lincoln County, Colorado
Rivers of Washington County, Colorado
Tributaries of the Kansas River